Pranciškus Baltrus Šivickis (born September 30, 1882, in the Raseiniai region of central Lithuania—died October 12, 1968) was a Lithuanian zoologist who moved to the United States where he completed his education. He became a professor at the University of the Philippines (Manila) before returning to Lithuania to become a professor at Kaunas University of Technology.

Early life
Šivickis was born in a village in Šiluva parish in the Raseiniai region of central Lithuania. He finished three years of schooling at a Russian school in Šiluva in 1900 and started work on his father's farm. He was interested in Lithuanian folk traditions and was involved as a patriot in revolutionary activities of 1905. Hearing that he was on a list of people that the Tsarist government planned to arrest, he moved to the United States in 1906. There he took various jobs and enrolled at evening classes, studying over the next few years at seven different US universities. By 1920 he had graduated from the Natural Sciences Department of the University of Chicago and two years later received his doctorate, his thesis being on the subject of the regeneration of flatworms.

He then took a post as Professor of Zoology at the University of the Philippines in Manila. Here he became a respected member of the scientific community known for his research, teaching work and organisational skills. His ambition however was to return to his native land and advance the field of Zoology in Lithuania.

Return to Lithuania
Šivickis returned to Lithuania in 1928 and joined the faculty at the Zoology and Comparative Anatomy Department of the University of Lithuania. He has been described as being the founder of the "Lithuanian school of ecological faunistic studies of invertebrates". Later he also took up a post as professor and head of the Department of Histology and Embryology at Vilnius University. He and the students he inspired published many scientific papers on soil, aquatic and parasitic invertebrates and other insects. He was a member of the Lithuanian Academy of Sciences and in 1952 he started the first parasitology laboratory in the country.

References

1882 births
1968 deaths
People from Raseiniai District Municipality
People from Kovno Governorate
Lithuanian zoologists
Academic staff of the Kaunas University of Technology
Academic staff of the University of the Philippines
University of Chicago alumni
Emigrants from the Russian Empire to the United States
20th-century zoologists